In geometry, the elongated dodecahedron, extended rhombic dodecahedron, rhombo-hexagonal dodecahedron or hexarhombic dodecahedron is a convex dodecahedron with 8 rhombic and 4 hexagonal faces. The hexagons can be made equilateral, or regular depending on the shape of the rhombi. It can be seen as constructed from a rhombic dodecahedron elongated by a square prism.

Parallelohedron
Along with the rhombic dodecahedron, it is a space-filling polyhedron, one of the five types of parallelohedron identified by Evgraf Fedorov that tile space face-to-face by translations. It has 5 sets of parallel edges, called zones or belts.

Tessellation 
 It can tesselate all space by translations.
 It is the Wigner–Seitz cell for certain body-centered tetragonal lattices.

This is related to the rhombic dodecahedral honeycomb with an elongation of zero. Projected normal to the elongation direction, the honeycomb looks like a square tiling with the rhombi projected into squares.

Variations
The expanded dodecahedra can be distorted into cubic volumes, with the honeycomb as a half-offset stacking of cubes. It can also be made concave by adjusting the 8 corners downward by the same amount as the centers are moved up.

The elongated dodecahedron can be constructed as a contraction of a uniform truncated octahedron, where square faces are  reduced to single edges and regular hexagonal faces are reduced to 60 degree rhombic faces (or pairs of equilateral triangles). This construction alternates square and rhombi on the 4-valence vertices, and has half the symmetry, D2h symmetry, order 8.

See also
 Trapezo-rhombic dodecahedron
 Elongated octahedron
 Elongated gyrobifastigium

References

 rhombo-hexagonal dodecahedron, p169
H.S.M. Coxeter, Regular Polytopes, Third edition, (1973), Dover edition,  p. 257

External links 
 
 
 Uniform space-filling using only rhombo-hexagonal dodecahedra
 Elongated dodecahedron VRML Model

Space-filling polyhedra
Zonohedra